The 15th New Zealand Parliament was a term of the New Zealand Parliament. It was elected at the 1902 general election in November and December of that year.

1902 electoral redistribution
The Representation Act 1900 had increased the membership of the House of Representatives from general electorates 70 to 76, and this was implemented through the 1902 electoral redistribution. In 1902, changes to the country quota affected the three-member electorates in the four main centres. The tolerance between electorates was increased to ±1,250 so that the Representation Commissions (since 1896, there had been separate commissions for the North and South Islands) could take greater account of communities of interest. These changes proved very disruptive to existing boundaries.

This boundary redistribution resulted in the abolition of three electorates:
, held by Richard Meredith
, held by Thomas Wilford
, held by Thomas Mackenzie

1902 general election

The 1902 general election was held on Tuesday, 25 November in the general electorates and on Monday, 22 December in the Māori electorates, respectively.  A total of 80 MPs were elected; 38 represented North Island electorates, 38 represented South Island electorates, and the remaining four represented Māori electorates.  415,789 voters were enrolled and the official turnout at the election was 76.7%.

Sessions
The 15th Parliament sat for three sessions, and was prorogued on 15 November 1905.

Ministries
The Liberal Government of New Zealand had taken office on 24 January 1891.  The Seddon Ministry under Richard Seddon had taken office in 1893 during the term of the 11th Parliament.  The Seddon Ministry remained in power for the whole term of this Parliament and held power until Seddon's death on 10 June 1906.

Party composition

Start of term

Initial composition of the 15th Parliament

Changes during 15th Parliament
There were a number of changes during the term of the 15th Parliament.

By-elections

Defections

Notes

References

15